Fab Four Suture is a compilation album by Stereolab, released in March 2006. It collects six singles and their B-sides originally released on 7-inch vinyl in 2005 and 2006.

Singles collected on Fab Four Suture
Released 12 September 2005 (UK), as three 7" singles:
Kybernetická Babička - ("Kyberneticka Babicka, Pt. 1", "Kyberneticka Babicka, Pt. 2")
Plastic Mile - ("Plastic Mile", "I Was a Sunny Rainphase")
Interlock - ("Interlock", "Visionary Road Maps")

Released 6 March 2006 (UK), as three 7" singles:
Whisper Pitch - ("Whisper Pitch", "Widow Weirdo")
Excursions Into - ("Excursions Into 'oh, a-oh'", "Get a Shot of the Refrigerator")
Eye Of The Volcano - ("Eye Of The Volcano", "Vodiak")

Track listing
 "Kyberneticka Babicka Pt 1." – 4:31
 "Interlock" – 4:10
 "Eye of the Volcano" – 4:16
 "Plastic Mile" – 5:11
 ""Get a Shot of the Refrigerator"" – 4:23
 "Visionary Road Maps" – 3:35
 "Vodiak" – 3:19
 "Whisper Pitch" – 3:55
 "Excursions Into "oh,a-oh"" – 5:27
 "I Was a Sunny Rainphase" – 3:27
 "Widow Weirdo" – 4:31
 "Kyberneticka Babicka Pt 2." – 4:56

References

2006 compilation albums
Stereolab compilation albums
Too Pure compilation albums